Lac des Mortes is a lake in the Doubs department of France, a twin lake of Lac de Bellefontaine. The lakes are near Chapelle-des-Bois and Bellefontaine.

Mortes